Correos (Spanish) or Correus (Catalan) was a former Barcelona metro station. The station site is located on what is now line L4 between the existing stations of Jaume I and Barceloneta, and under the street of Via Laietana.

The station opened in 1934 as a terminus of a branch of the Gran Metro de Barcelona, Barcelona's first metro line. The Gran Metro de Barcelona came to be known as  line L3 but Correos remained the terminus of a branch. The station was dismantled in 1972 to permit the extension of the line into La Barceloneta, as part of the integration of the branch into line L4.

Along with Banco, it is one of the two metro stations on Via Laietana that have disappeared.

See also
Disused Barcelona Metro stations
Gaudí (Barcelona Metro)
Banc (Barcelona Metro)

References

External links
Lost Barcelona metro stations (with photos)

Disused Barcelona Metro stations
Defunct railway stations in Spain
Railway stations in Spain opened in 1934
Railway stations closed in 1972